In electronics, an antenna amplifier (also: aerial amplifier or booster) is a device that amplifies an antenna signal, usually into an output with the same impedance as the input impedance. Typically 75 ohm for coaxial cable and 300 ohm for twin-lead cable.

An antenna amplifier boosts a radio signal considerably for devices that receive radio waves. Many devices have an RF amplifier stage in their circuitry, that amplifies the antenna signal, these include, but are not limited to; radios, televisions, mobile phones and Wi-Fi and Bluetooth devices. Amplifiers amplify everything, both the desired signal present at the antenna, and the noise. Typical signal noises include: ambient background noise (electric brush noise from electric motors, high voltage sources from, for example a gasoline engine ignition, or large dispersed currents in the vicinity of the desired reception electric fence). To add, consideration must be taken for the noise generated by the amplifier itself and all other electrical noise which may be generated by the device that is to receive a signal, for example a lot of consideration has to go into mobile phone circuitry design to eliminate as much noise from its own circuitry in order to not disturb the desired transmission signals from its own antenna(ae).

An indoor antenna may include an amplifier circuit, whereby powered reception of the signal can help with capturing as much of an FM, UHF/VHF signal, for amplifying a radio or television signal. Its draw backs are that any noise is usually amplified as well, and a common result from this is amplification of ghost images (for analog signals), and any other perturberances that may be existing locally or even extra terrestrially like the Cosmic microwave background radiation for devices that work in that frequency range.

The key to a "good" level of input at your receiver with the minimum amount noise includes many design considerations in an electrical amplifier. In theory it is best if you amplify a "clean" signal to a higher level than a "noisy" signal to a higher level, and many circuits include filters to remove all but the desired reception signal. Some consideration has to be taken for cable loss and the signal frequencies desired for example higher frequency (VHF or higher: 2.4 GHz Wi-Fi/third generation mobile phone.) the more the loss that the cable has, and the more susceptible the transmission cable is to noise degradation. Starting with a signal from the antenna which is then directed through a coaxial cable, the amount of loss depends upon a number of factors, cable type and cable length are the two most important. Cable is rated in db loss per length of cable at a specified frequency, for example RG-6 coaxial cable is the cable most used for Television reception.
 Belden 1829AC Coax - Series 6 has a loss of 4 db/100 feet at 500 MHz (TV Channel 18)- 495.250
Channel 32 which is 580 MHz, Channel 52 is 700 MHz a 5 db loss At TV channel 2, the cable would have a loss of 1.4 db. So at channel 18 you would lose more than 1/2 the power in 100' of cable between the antenna and the TV.

See also

 Balun
 Cosmic microwave background radiation

References

Electronic amplifiers
Radio electronics